Parashu Pradhan is a  Nepalese short story writer. He has published multiple books and short stories.

Early life and education 
He was born on February 12, 1944 (Magh 30, 2000 BS) in Bhojpur district, Nepal to father Ram Bahadur Pradhan and mother Indira Pradhan. He passed his SLC level education in 2014 BS (1958) from Bhojpur Vidyodaya School and completed his Bachelor's degree through private education. He received an MA degree in Nepali and Political Science.

Bibliography 
He has published over a dozen books, including:  Uttarardha (The Latter Half). His stories include: Dalle Khola (The Dalle River), Tokiyoma Sano Buddha (The Little Buddha in Tokyo), Uttarardha (The Latter Half), Chesta, Chesta, Chesta (Attempts!!!), Ma Tero Logne Hu Nirmala (I am Your Husband, Nirmala), Tebal Mathiko Aakasbani (The Telegram on the Table).

See also 

 Bairagi Kainla
 Ramesh Bikal

References

Nepalese male short story writers
Nepalese short story writers
Living people
People from Bhojpur District, Nepal
1944 births
20th-century Nepalese writers
Nepalese writers